Covenant College is a private, liberal arts, Christian college in Lookout Mountain, Georgia, located near Chattanooga, Tennessee. As the college of the Presbyterian Church in America, Covenant teaches subjects from a Reformed theological worldview. Approximately 1,000 students attend Covenant each year.

History
Founded in 1955 in Pasadena, California, as an agency of the Bible Presbyterian Church, Covenant College and Covenant Theological Seminary moved its campus to St. Louis, Missouri, the following year. Following a split among the Bible Presbyterians, it became affiliated with the Bible Presbyterian Church-Columbus Synod (renamed the Evangelical Presbyterian Church in 1961). In 1964, it separated from the seminary, moving to Lookout Mountain, in Georgia. In 1965, it was the site of the merger between the Evangelical Presbyterian Church and the Reformed Presbyterian Church, General Synod to form the Reformed Presbyterian Church, Evangelical Synod. It became and remains an agency of the Presbyterian Church in America after the 1982 merger between the RPCES and the PCA. As such, Covenant stands in the Reformed and Presbyterian traditions.

Presidents
 Robert G. Rayburn (1955–1965)
 Marion Barnes (1965–1978)
 Martin Essenburg (1978–1987)
 Frank A. Brock (1987–2002)
 Niel Nielson (2002–2012)
 J. Derek Halvorson (2012–present)

Academics

Covenant College offers liberal arts education from a Reformed Christian perspective. The focus of the college is found in its motto, "In All Things Christ Preeminent." The purpose of this focus is to ground excellence in academic inquiry in a biblically grounded frame of reference.

The college offers Bachelor of Arts, Master of Arts in Teaching, and Master of Education degrees, and academic certificates in Arts Administration, Entrepreneurship, Environmental Stewardship and Sustainability, Journalism and Society, Medical Ethics Consultation, Neuroscience, and Teaching English to Speakers of Other Languages (TESOL). 

The college has been accredited since 1971 by the Southern Association of Colleges and Schools (SACS).

Research Institutions 
The Chalmers Center for Economic and Community Development (established 1999), which is now a 501(c)3 non-profit, was founded at Covenant to offer courses and programs in community and economic development in the urban United States and throughout the majority world.

Student publications 
Students at Covenant publish a bi-weekly newspaper called The Bagpipe, which includes reporting on campus news, events, and local issues as well as art and media reviews, opinions, and more. A satirical version is published annually on April 1 called The Windbag with takes on campus life and culture.

Covenant's literary magazine is The Thorn and has been published annually since 1970. The magazine features creative work from the students, including poetry, short stories, and personal essays.

Faculty 
Covenant has 64 full-time faculty, 89% of whom have doctorates or terminal degrees. The student-faculty ratio is 12:1. This ratio allows "personal, small class size."

Faculty are required to state their agreement with the Westminster Confession of Faith.

Athletics
The Covenant athletic teams are called the Scots. The college is a member of the NCAA Division III ranks, primarily competing in the newly-created Collegiate Conference of the South (CCS) since the 2022–23 academic year. The Scots previously competed in the D-III USA South Athletic Conference (USA South) from 2013–14 to 2021–22; the defunct D-III Great South Athletic Conference (GSAC) from 2010–11 to 2011–12 (although its women's sports continued until 2012–13); as an NCAA D-III Independent during the 2009–10 and 2012–13 school years; and in the Appalachian Athletic Conference (AAC) of the National Association of Intercollegiate Athletics (NAIA) from 2001–02 to 2008–09.

Covenant competes in 14 intercollegiate varsity sports: Men's sports include baseball, basketball, cross country, golf, soccer, tennis and track & field; while women's sports include basketball, cross country, soccer, softball, tennis, track & field and volleyball. Former sports included women's golf.

Campus

The campus is located at the top of Lookout Mountain in Dade County, Georgia, near the city of Lookout Mountain, Georgia.

Carter Hall
Carter Hall is the signature building on campus. It was originally named The Lookout Mountain Hotel and was built in 1928 by the Dinkler Hotel Corporation and run by Paul Carter, for whom the building is now named. It has been rumored, although not confirmed, that Elizabeth Taylor and Eddie Fisher spent their honeymoon there. It was popularly known as the "Castle in the Clouds." However, since it was completed less than a year before the Great Depression, the hotel soon went bankrupt. It opened and closed several times prior to 1960, when it shut down for the last time. Bill Brock, the grandfather of the college's fourth president, Frank Brock, served on the original board of the hotel.

Both the exterior and interior of Carter Hall are Austro-Bavarian Gothic revival in style. The building has had two towers in its history. The first tower was similar in design to the Frauenkirche (Cathedral of Our Lady) in Munich. Poor maintenance before acquisition by the college required it to be rebuilt. The new tower, though considerably simpler in style, maintains the architectural style of the original tower.
Covenant College bought the building in 1964, upon relocating to Lookout Mountain. During the first few years of Covenant's operation on the mountain, all the functions of the college were contained within Carter Hall. At that time, it housed the chapel, the library, the classrooms, the professors' offices, dorm rooms, the dining hall, and administrative offices. Today, it has all of these except the library and chapel, as well as a snack bar, the campus bookstore, and the mailroom.

The current halls of Carter are Summit and Borderlands (men's); 4th North, Central, and South (women's); 3rd North, Central, and South (women's); 2nd North, Central, and South (men's).

From 2015 to 2017, Carter underwent significant renovations. They included improving the stucco, fixing insulation and moisture issues, and renovating the tower.

Founders Hall
Founders Hall contains three wings, each named for members of the founding generation of Covenant College.

Belz Hall, the first to be built, was completed in 1972, is named after pastor and Christian educator Max Belz, a member of Covenant College's original board of trustees. Belz Hall houses approximately 100 students and was originally a men's dorm. In 1990 and 1993 two new wings were added to the structure, and the building was renamed Founders Residence Hall. Currently the dorm halls for Belz are as follows: Ekklesia (a men's hall on the main floor), Brethren (a men's hall on the second floor), 1st Belz (a men's hall on the first floor), and Catacombs (a men's floor on the basement level).

Schmidt Hall, completed in 1990, is named in honor of Rudy and Collyn Schmidt, co-founders and long-time friends of the college, involved in virtually every dimension of college life since its inception. The dorm halls in Schmidt include Balcony (a women's hall on the fourth floor), Jungle (a women's hall on the main floor), and Jubilee (a women's hall on the second floor).

Rayburn Hall was completed in 1993 and is named for Robert G. Rayburn, the founding president of Covenant College. The dorm halls in Rayburn include Highlands (a women's hall on the fourth floor), Gracewell (a women's hall on the main floor), and Blackwatch (a men's hall on the second floor).

Maclellan/Rymer Hall
The Maclellan wing of the hall, built in 1998, was named in honor of the Maclellan Foundation, a longtime supporter of Covenant College. The dorm halls in Maclellan wing of the building include Sutherland (a men's hall on the second floor), Suburbs (a men's hall on the third floor), Rowan (a women's hall on the fourth floor), and Halcyon (a women's hall on the fifth floor).
The Rymer wing of the building, completed in 2000, was given by Ann Caudle Rymer and her son, S. Bradford Rymer Jr. The dorm halls in the Rymer wing include The Five Points (a men's hall on the second floor), Lawrence (a men's hall on the third floor), Harambe! (a women's hall on the fourth floor), and Chi Alpha (a women's hall on the fifth floor).

Andreas Hall
Andreas Hall, completed in 2007 as part of the BUILD campaign, is located slightly south of Maclellan/Rymer Hall, and is the newest addition to the college's residence halls. It is named for Lowell Andreas, a recent financial supporter of Covenant College. It houses over 100 students and is four stories tall.
The dorm halls in Andreas include Ithaca (a men's hall on the second floor), Bloodfield (a men's hall on the second floor), Ruhama (a women's hall on the third floor), Kallah (a women's hall on the third floor), The Fritz (a women's hall on the fourth floor), and Imani (a women's hall on the fourth floor). The second floor of Andreas refers to themselves as Ithafield (Ithaca + Bloodfield), the third floor as Ruhallah (Ruhama + Kallah), and the fourth floor as Fritzmani (Fritz + Imani). This helps create unity between the pairs of brother and sister halls that share each floor.

Notable alumni

 Rifqa Bary (2018), religious convert.
 Aaron Belz (1993), poet
 Joel Belz (1962), founder, God's World Publications, former publisher, WORLD Magazine
 Mark David Chapman (attended one semester), criminal, found guilty in the 1980 murder of British musician John Lennon
 Wes King (1981), recording artist 
 Kathryn Kimball Mizelle (2009), United States District Judge of the United States District Court for the Middle District of Florida
 Paul Moser (1979), analytical philosopher
 Isaac Wardell (2005), musician and music producer

Notes

References

External links
 Official website
 Official athletics website

1955 establishments in Georgia (U.S. state)
Buildings and structures in Dade County, Georgia
Dinkler hotels
Education in Pasadena, California
Education in Dade County, Georgia
Educational institutions established in 1955
Lookout Mountain
Presbyterian Church in America
Presbyterian universities and colleges in the United States
Presbyterianism in California
Presbyterianism in Georgia (U.S. state)
Universities and colleges accredited by the Southern Association of Colleges and Schools
Liberal arts colleges in Georgia (U.S. state)
Council for Christian Colleges and Universities
Collegiate Conference of the South schools
Former USA South Athletic Conference schools
Private universities and colleges in Georgia (U.S. state)